Ribeira Principal is a stream in the northern part of the island of Santiago, Cape Verde. It flows completely within the municipality of São Miguel. Its source is in the Serra Malagueta mountains. It flows generally north, through the valley of Principal, and joins the Atlantic Ocean near Achada Monte.

See also
List of streams in Cape Verde

References

External links

Rivers of Cape Verde
Geography of Santiago, Cape Verde
São Miguel, Cape Verde